Autoliv is a Sweden automotive safety supplier with sales to all leading car manufacturers worldwide.  Together with its joint ventures, Autoliv has over 68,000 employees in 27 countries, of whom 5700 are involved in research, development and engineering. In addition, the company has 14 technical centers around the world, including 20 test tracks, more than any other automotive safety supplier.

The group is among the largest Tier 1 automotive suppliers in the world, with annual revenues exceeding USD 8 billion, and is part of the Fortune 500, ranking #289 in 2018.

Autoliv is headquartered in Stockholm, Sweden. In the United States, Autoliv, Inc. is incorporated in Delaware, USA. The company's shares are listed on the New York Stock Exchange and its Swedish Depository Receipts on the Nasdaq Stockholm.

History
Autoliv was founded in Vårgårda, Sweden in the form of Auto Service AB in 1953 by Lennart Lindblad. In 1956, the company became a pioneer in seat belt technology when it began production of two-point seat belts. The name of the company was changed to Autoliv AB in 1968. It was bought in 1974 by Granges Weda AB, inventors of the retractable seat belt. Granges Weda was acquired in turn in 1989 by Electrolux and changed its name to Electrolux Autoliv AB. During the 1980s and 1990s, the company grew through acquisitions, mainly in Europe. Between 1994 and 1997 the company was listed on the Stockholm Stock Exchange under the name of Autoliv AB and in 1997 it merged with the American firm Morton ASP Inc to form Autoliv Inc. In June 2018, the company spun off its Electronics business into a separate company Veoneer Inc.

In November 2019, Autoliv selected Fredrik Westin as Chief Financial Officer and Executive Vice President, succeeding Interim CFO Christian Hanke.

Products
The company develops, manufactures and markets safety systems (estimated market share of approximately 42% in 2020) such as airbags, seatbelts, steering wheels, and passive safety electronics. It also produces pedestrian protection systems.

See also
List of Swedish companies
Veoneer

References

External links

 

Companies listed on the New York Stock Exchange
Electronics companies of Sweden
Multinational companies headquartered in Sweden
Swedish companies established in 1997
Technology companies established in 1997
Manufacturing companies established in 1997
Manufacturing companies based in Stockholm